Heinrich Freyer (Slovenized: Henrik Freyer; July 8, 1802 – August 21, 1866) was a Carniolan botanist, zoologist, paleontologist, pharmacist, cartographer, and natural scientist.

References

1802 births
1866 deaths
Slovenian botanists
Slovenian zoologists
Slovenian paleontologists
Slovenian cartographers
University of Vienna alumni
People from Idrija